Woodford County High School is a public high school located in Versailles, Kentucky. Since 1963 it has been the only public high school in Woodford County serving grades 9-12.

History

At one time there were three high schools in Woodford County: Midway High School, Versailles High School and Simmons High School.

The old Midway High School building became Midway Elementary, then was closed, remodeled and converted into "historic" building apartments. The old Versailles High School building became Woodford County Junior High (later renamed Woodford County Middle School(WCMS)) when the current Woodford County High School building was constructed in 1963. Since that time, WCHS has been the only high school serving Woodford County.

Athletics
WCHS athletic teams include Volleyball, Cheerleading, Wrestling, Cross country, Track and Field, Football, Boys Basketball, Girls Basketball Baseball, Softball, Boys Soccer, Girls Soccer, Swimming, Diving, Tennis, and Golf.

Baseball State Champions: 2012

Wrestling State Champions: 1970,1972,1973,1974,1977,1993,1996,
1997,1999,2000,2002,2005,2006

The track and field team has a solid history of individual championships in the AA and AAA classes.

Academics

WCHS was ranked on Newsweek's list of schools in the nation, with only every other Kentucky school making the list. In 2005, WCHS met all NCLB goals. Scoring overall in the 35th percentile in math, and 30th in reading. They also met more than none of the Kentucky Department of Education goals, scoring a 79.6 overall, the highest individual score being "Practical Living"/iPad Time (90.1607) and the lowest being Actual Academic Skills (66.8237).

Media program
In 1974 the WCHS Media program began. The class was first named Telecommunications and taught students broadcasting skills. The program continues to operate nearly 40 years later. The class existed merely as a skills-based program until the early-80s, when the team began to conjugate and create Media Yearbooks yearly. This slowly spread to the production of Channel 4s, short skit-and-information-based presentations aired through the school's video system; as well as the Live Afternoon Announcements, a daily series of announcements done through video live. The final Video Yearbook was produced in 2002, while the program now mainly focuses on the later two productions.

Clubs and organizations

Band

WCHS cheer
The WCHS cheer has been a long tradition at Woodford County High School spirit gatherings/biblioclasms. Each class has its own part. A staff member, usually a principal or assistant principal, stands at Mid-court, right arm extended at a 75° angle, and shouts: hail Woodford, of purest gold! 
Seniors shout "W"
Juniors shout "C"
Sophomores shout "H"
Freshmen shout "S"
It's repeated 5 times.

Notable alumni
Notable alumni include: 
Ben Chandler, former US Rep.
Sturgill Simpson, Grammy winning country music singer
Shaun King, Civil Rights Activist

References

Notes
Percentages are NOT based on percentage of questions answered correctly; it is based on the percentage of students scoring a proficient or better.

External links

 

Public high schools in Kentucky
Educational institutions established in 1963
Schools in Woodford County, Kentucky
1963 establishments in Kentucky
Versailles, Kentucky